The 1967 Western Kentucky Hilltoppers football team represented Western Kentucky University as a member of the Ohio Valley Conference (OVC) during the 1967 NCAA College Division football season. Led by Nick Denes in his 11th and final season as head coach, the Hilltoppers compiled and overall record of 7–1–1 with a mark of 5–1–1 in conference play, placing second in the OVC.

Assistant coach Jimmy Feix succeeded Denes as head coach after the season. Also on the coaching staff were future National Football League (NFL) head coaches Jerry Glanville and Joe Bugel. The team roster included future NFL players Roy Bondurant, Lawrence Brame, and Bill "Jelly" Green, as well as future NFL coach Romeo Crennel. Dickie Moore was named to the AP All-American team and was Ohio Valley Conference Player of the Year. The All-OVC team included Bondurant, Jim Garrett, Walt Heath, Allan Hogan, Moore, Larry Watkins, Brame, Bill Hape, Johnny Jaggers, and Fred Snyder.

Schedule

References

Western Kentucky
Western Kentucky Hilltoppers football seasons
Western Kentucky Hilltoppers football